Gorgopis alticola is a moth of the family Hepialidae. It is known from Tanzania.

References

Moths described in 1910
Hepialidae